Bourneotrochus is a genus of cnidarians belonging to the family Caryophylliidae.

The species of this genus are found in Australia.

Species:

Bourneotrochus stellulatus 
Bourneotrochus veroni

References

Caryophylliidae
Scleractinia genera